Rajur is a census town in Yavatmal district in the Indian state of Maharashtra. Rajur is also known as Rajur Colliery.

Geography 
Rajur has an average elevation  of 741  metres (2431 feet).

Demographics 
 India census, Rajur had a population of 11,677. Males constitute 52% of the population and females 48%. Rajur has an average literacy rate of 70%, higher than the national average of 59.5%: male literacy is 78%, and female literacy is 62%.  In Rajur, 13% of the population is under 6 years of age.

Notable People 
 Anand Teltumbde, civil rights activist, scholar and columnist. 
 Milind Teltumbde, Maoist politician.

References 

Cities and towns in Yavatmal district